Rudolph Herbert Weingartner (February 12, 1927 – November 16, 2020) was an American philosopher and academic administrator. He served as provost of the University of Pittsburgh and dean of Northwestern University's Weinberg College of Arts and Sciences.

Biography 
Weingartner was born on February 12, 1927, in Heidelberg, Germany, and came to the United States at the age of 12 with his parents. His family settled in New York City, and Weingartner attended Brooklyn Technical High School before serving in the United States Navy in 1945, serving in the Pacific Theater following the surrender of Japan. He then received his bachelor's, master's, and doctoral degrees from Columbia University.

He began his academic career at San Francisco State University and then served as chairman of the philosophy department at Vassar College. He then became a full-time administrator, serving as dean of the College of Arts and Sciences at Northwestern University for 13 years. He was provost of the University of Pittsburgh from 1987 to 1989 and taught philosophy there until his retirement.

He received a Guggenheim Fellowship in 1965. Weingartner died on November 16, 2020, in Mexico City at age 93.

References 

1927 births
2020 deaths
University of Pittsburgh faculty
Northwestern University faculty
Columbia College (New York) alumni
Columbia Graduate School of Arts and Sciences alumni

Brooklyn Technical High School alumni
People from Heidelberg
Vassar College faculty
American academic administrators
American people of German-Jewish descent
Jewish American academics